The Woman with the World Record is a 1927 German silent film directed by Erich Waschneck and starring Joop van Hulzen, Lee Parry and Henry Stuart.

The film's sets were designed by Robert A. Dietrich.

Cast
 Joop van Hulzen as Dr. John Forbes
 Lee Parry as Lee, John's wife
 Henry Stuart as Will Carry, a sports patron
 Valerie Boothby as Mary, a world champion swimmer
 Hans Adalbert Schlettow as Tom Wobber, a manager
 Gerhard Ritterband as Robby, Tom's assistant
 Otto Kronburger as Peter Stanley, a friend of John and Lee

References

Bibliography
 Grange, William. Cultural Chronicle of the Weimar Republic. Scarecrow Press, 2008.

External links

1927 films
Films of the Weimar Republic
German silent feature films
Films directed by Erich Waschneck
National Film films
German black-and-white films
1920s German films